Unparty: The Consensus-Building Party (formerly the People's Senate Party) was a political party in British Columbia. It was registered on September 20, 2011, and changed its name from People's Senate Party to Unparty in August 2012. The main plank of the party's platform was the promotion of consensus governance over adversarial party politics. Unparty wanted to see meetings held on political issues at the local level that employ consensus decision-making techniques, and for Members of the Legislative Assembly to bring those policy decisions to the Legislative Assembly of British Columbia in Victoria.

The party nominated two candidates in the May 14, 2013 provincial election to promote these ideas and Consensus decision-making more broadly. These candidates were:

 Chanel Donovan, Richmond Centre
 Michael Donovan, Richmond-Steveston

It ran no candidates in the 2017 British Columbia general election nor in the 2020 British Columbia general election.

See also
 Consensus decision-making

External links
 Unparty: The Consensus-Building Party 
 Georgia Straight article
 Richmond News, April 2013
 Richmond News, May 2013

2011 establishments in British Columbia
Political parties established in 2011
Provincial political parties in British Columbia